WikiConference or Wiki Conference may refer to:

WikiConference North America, an official user group and annual Wikimedia conference dedicated to projects and volunteers in North America
Wiki Conference India, a national Wikipedia conference organized in India
, an annual convention of German-speaking communities of Wikimedia projects

See also
 Wikipedia:WikiCon